Thomas Wintringham may refer to:
Thomas Wintringham (15th-century MP), in 1406 MP for Northampton (UK Parliament constituency)
Thomas Wintringham (Liberal politician) (1867–1921), British Liberal Member of Parliament 1920–1921
Tom Wintringham (1898–1949), British soldier, military historian, journalist, poet, Marxist, politician, author and founder of the Common Wealth Party